Ruan Fangfu (阮芳赋) also called Fang Fu Ruan is a Chinese physician and medical historian. He is editor and author of A Chinese manual of Sex Knowledge (性知识手册, Xingzhishi Shouce, 1985). His most famous work is Sex in China: Studies in Sexology in Chinese Culture (1991). He is a member of the International Encyclopedia of Sexuality (IES).

See also
Taoist sexual practices

References

Chinese sexologists
Living people
Year of birth missing (living people)